Kudrino is a rural locality (a village) in Cheryomushskoye Rural Settlement of Kotlassky District, Arkhangelsk Oblast, Russia. The population was 1 as of 2010.

Geography 
Kudrino is located 23 km south of Kotlas (the district's administrative centre) by road. Varavino is the nearest rural locality.

References 

Rural localities in Kotlassky District